Government Ayurvedic College, Guwahati  is an institute of Ayurveda in Jalukbari, Assam, North East India. Established in 1948, the college was first affiliated by Gauhati University and was later brought under Srimanta Sankaradeva University of Health Sciences in 2010.

History
It was established after independence of India with by the efforts of  Lokpriya Gopinath Bordoloi, Lokbandhu Bhuvaneswar Baruah and founder principal Jagdish Ch. Bhattacharya. This college was started in a rented house at Uzan bazaar on 20 December 1948 by the then Chief Minister of Assam Lokpriya Gopinath Bordoloi.  In July 1959 the college was permanently shifted to present site at Jalukbari, Assam.

Courses

Graduate education
 Degree awarded: Bachelor of Ayurvedic Medicine and Surgery (BAMS): 63 seats 
 Duration of the course: Five and a half years including one-year internship.
Admission into BAMS course is based on National Eligibility Cum Entrance Test(NEET) conducted by National Testing Agency.

Postgraduate education
Admission into MD/MS(AYU) course is based on All India Ayush Post Graduate Entrance Test (AIAPGET) conducted by National Testing Agency.

Seat distribution-
M.D. (Ayurveda) in Kaya Chikitsa.
 6 seats
M.D. (Ayurveda) in Samhita Siddhanta
 6 seats
M.S. (Ayurveda) in Shalya Tantra
 3 seats
M.S. (Ayurveda) in Prasuti Tantra & Stree Roga : 4 seats
M.D. (Ayurveda) in Roga Nidan
 3 seats
M.D. (Ayurveda) in Sharir Rachana
 2 seats

Other courses
 Ph.D.

Departments
Kaya Chikitsa (Medicine)
Shalya (General Surgery)
Shalakya (ENT & Ophthalmology)
Sanskrit, Samhita and Siddhanta (Basic Principles)
Prasuti Tantra & Striroga (Obstetrics & Gynaecology)
Bala Roga (Pediatrics)
Pancakarma (Physiotherapy)
Swasthavritta (Preventive & Social Medicine)
Dravyaguna (Pharmacology)
Rasashastra & Bhaisajya Kalpana (Rejuvenative & Pharmaceutical Science)
Agada tantra & Vidhi Shastra (Toxicology & Forensic Medicine)
Roga Nidan & Vikriti Vigyan (Diagnostic & Pathological Science)
Rachana Sarir (Anatomy)
Kriya Sarir (Physiology)

References

Ayurvedic colleges
Universities and colleges in Guwahati
Educational institutions established in 1948
1948 establishments in India